Closterium setaceum is a species of unicellular charophyte green algae in the family Closteriaceae. It has a worldwide distribution.

References

External links 
 Closterium setaceum  at AlgaeBase

Desmidiales
Plants described in 1848